Steve Nordick is a Canadian politician, who represented the rural Yukon electoral district of Klondike in the Yukon Legislative Assembly from 2006 to 2011. He is a member of the Yukon Party.

Political career

Nordick was elected MLA for Klondike in the 2006 Yukon election. He served as Deputy Speaker of the Legislative Assembly from November 2006 until his appointment to Premier Darrell Pasloski's Cabinet in May 2011. He assumed responsibility for the Department of Economic Development, the Yukon Housing Corporation, Yukon Liquor Corporation, and the Yukon Lottery Commission.

Nordick was defeated by Yukon Liberal Sandy Silver in the 2011 Yukon election.

Personal life

Nordick and his wife have owned a bed and breakfast in Dawson City, Yukon since 1999. Before electoral politics, he was an operations manager for a petroleum company, hauled fuel and freight as a long haul truck driver, and drove tour bus for a local company. He is a former member of the Board of Directors of the Klondike Visitor's Association and the Dawson City Chamber of Commerce.

He is originally from Saskatchewan.

Electoral record

Yukon general election, 2011

|-

| Liberal
| Sandy Silver
| align="right"| 530
| align="right"| 48.8%
| align="right"| +34.1%
|-

|-

| NDP
| Jorn Meir
| align="right"| 147
| align="right"| 13.5%
| align="right"| -19.6%
|-
! align=left colspan=3|Total
! align=right| 1,085
! align=right| 100.0%
! align=right| –
|}

Yukon general election, 2006

|NDP
| Jorn Meier
|align="right"| 297
|align="right"| 33.1%
|align="right"| +11.8%
|-
 
| style="width: 130px" |Liberal
| Steve Taylor
|align="right"| 132
|align="right"| 14.7%
|align="right"| -9.2%
|-

| style="width: 130px" |Independent
| Glen Everitt
|align="right"| 56
|align="right"| 6.2%
|align="right"| +6.2%
|- bgcolor="white"
!align="left" colspan=3|Total
!align="right"| 898
!align="right"| 100.0%
!align="right"| –

References

Yukon Party MLAs
Living people
21st-century Canadian politicians
Year of birth missing (living people)